Dayton House is a historic home located at Lima in Livingston County, New York. It was built about 1844 and expanded and upgraded in the 1850s / 1860s.  It is a two-story, three bay dwelling with Greek Revival form and an overlay of Italianate and Gothic Revival design elements.  Also on the property is a large carriage house, smoke house, and original cast iron lamp post.

It was listed on the National Register of Historic Places in 1989.

References

Houses on the National Register of Historic Places in New York (state)
Greek Revival houses in New York (state)
Houses completed in 1844
Houses in Livingston County, New York
National Register of Historic Places in Livingston County, New York